The spotted nightingale-thrush has been split into the following:

 Yellow-throated nightingale-thrush, Catharus dryas
 Speckled nightingale-thrush, Catharus maculatus

Birds by common name